The common eagle ray (Myliobatis aquila) is a species of fish in the family Myliobatidae. It inhabits the eastern Atlantic Ocean (North Sea to South Africa), the Mediterranean Sea and the south-western Indian Ocean.

Description
It has a rhomboidal disc with a pair of large, triangular pectoral fins projecting on either side, and a single dorsal fin. The snout is rounded and the tail slender, with a large spine at its base but no tail fin. The dorsal surface is brown or black while the ventral surface is white.

Distribution and habitat
This species occurs in the eastern Atlantic Ocean, including the North Sea, from the British Isles to South Africa, extending to the Indian Ocean. It is also found in the Mediterranean Sea. It occurs both close to the shore and further out, at depths down to about 800 m, but much of its time is spent in very shallow water at less than 50 m.

Ecology
The species largely feeds on crustaceans and bivalve molluscs that it excavates from the seabed. Other items in its diet include polychaete worms, gastropod molluscs, sea pens and small fish. Instead of having pointed teeth, it has flattened hexagonal bars and plates arranged in a mosaic pattern on its jaws; with these, it crushes the shells of its prey.

Reproduction is oviviviparous. A clutch of three to seven young develop inside the mother, receiving nourishment at first from their egg yolks, but later from fluids secreted by their mother into her uterus.

Status
The taxonomic position of this fish is unclear as populations in the Mediterranean Sea may be a different species from those in the southeastern Atlantic. In the Gulf of Lion in the northwestern Mediterranean Sea, populations declined in the 1970s, and there and elsewhere in the Mediterranean, the fish is under threat from intensive fishing. Along the coast of West Africa it is also the subject of artisanal fishing activities but these are less intensive and populations may be steady. The International Union for Conservation of Nature to rate it as "critically endangered".

References

External links

Myliobatis
Fish described in 1758
Taxa named by Carl Linnaeus